Rodrigo Altmann Ortiz was a politician from Social Christian Unity Party of Costa Rica who served as First Vice President of Costa Rica.

Personal life 
He was born in San José, Costa Rica on February 20, 1930 in the family of José Altmann and Lia Ortiz Roger. He was specialist in surgery.

References 

Vice presidents of Costa Rica
Costa Rican politicians